Han Ji-an (born Kim Hee-jin on March 17, 1991) is a South Korean actress.

Filmography

Television series

Film

Theater / musical

References

External links
 Official website 
 

1991 births
Living people
Dongguk University alumni
South Korean television actresses
South Korean film actresses
South Korean stage actresses
21st-century South Korean actresses